Georgios Pilavakhis was a Greek water polo player. He competed in the men's tournament at the 1920 Summer Olympics.

References

External links
 

Year of birth missing
Year of death missing
Greek male water polo players
Olympic water polo players of Greece
Water polo players at the 1920 Summer Olympics
Place of birth missing